was a Japanese philosopher who studied Chinese philosophy.

Life
Imamichi taught in Europe (Paris and Germany) as well as in Japan (he was also emeritus professor of the University of Palermo). Beginning in 1979 he was the president of the Centre International pour l'Étude Comparée de Philosophie et d'Esthétique and after 1997 of the International Institute of Philosophy. In 1976 he founded the journal Aesthetics.

He translated Aristotle's Poetics into Japanese (in 1972) and has written numerous books in Japanese. Imamichi was a supporter of communication between cultures. He characterizes Western philosophy as an attempt to achieve a God's eye view (das in-dem-Gott-sein; to be in the being of God) and Eastern philosophy as an attempt to be in the world (das in-der-Welt-sein). Imamichi sees in both stances two incomplete and complementary humanisms, and observes that since the publication of The Book of Tea, some Western philosophers have adopted a more Eastern stance while other Eastern philosophers have attempted to reach the Absolute or the Eternal.

Tomonobu Imamichi was the father of guitarist and songwriter Tomotaka Imamichi, pianist Nobuko Kawaguchi, biologist Yukiko Imamichi and psychologist Tomoaki Imamichi.

Bibliography 
 In Search of Wisdom. One Philosopher's Journey, Tokyo, International House of Japan, 2004
 'Restrospectiva et Prospectiva Eco-ethics' in Acta Institutionis Philosophiae et Aestheticae, 2004, 22:1-10 (an article written in English, Latin, German, French, Chinese, etc.)
Betrachtungen über das Eine,  Institute of Aesthetics of Tokyo, 1968
Aspects of Beautiful and Art, 1968
Self-Development of the Identity, 1970
The Localisation and the orientation of Interpretation, 1972
Essay on Beauty, 1973
Studia Comparata de Esthetica, 1976
Aristotle, 1980
Aesthetics in the Orient, 1980
Philosophy in the East and in the West, 1981
Contemporary Philosophy, 1984
The History of the Western Philosophy, 1986
Eco-Ethica, 1990
Le texte comme distance de la Divinité, in Archivio di filosofia anno LX, 1992, 1-3
Introduzione alla Filosofia Naturale, 1993.

References

External links 
Quick biography of Tomonobu Imamichi 
The Japanese Eco-Ethics, interview 

1922 births
2012 deaths
20th-century essayists
20th-century Japanese philosophers
21st-century essayists
Aristotelian philosophers
Commentators on Aristotle
Continental philosophers
Environmental philosophers
Environmental writers
Epistemologists
Historians of philosophy
History of philosophy
Humanists
Intellectual historians
Intellectual history
Interculturalism
Japanese essayists
Japanese ethicists
Japanese expatriates in France
Japanese expatriates in Germany
Japanese expatriates in Italy
21st-century Japanese philosophers
Metaphysicians
Metaphysics writers
Ontologists
People from Tokyo
Philosophers of art
Philosophers of culture
Philosophers of education
Philosophers of history
Philosophers of literature
Philosophers of mind
Philosophers of social science
Recipients of the Medal with Purple Ribbon
Social commentators
Social philosophers
Theorists on Western civilization
Academic staff of the University of Palermo